The Montt family of Chile, descended from Catalan immigrants to the country, includes a number of people who achieved political office and prominence in other fields:

José Anacleto Montt Goyenechea (1802–1867): lawyer and politician
Manuel Montt (1809–1880): politician and President of Chile
Rosario Montt (1827–1894): First Lady of Chile
Ambrosio Montt Luco (1830–1899):  politician and lawyer
 (1861–1882): soldier and hero of the War of the Pacific
Pedro Montt (1849–1910): politician and President of Chile
Jorge Montt (1845–1922): admiral, politician and President of Chile
: First Lady of Chile
 (1848–1909): lawyer, deputy, writer, historiographer, son of Manuel Montt Torres, and brother of Pedro Montt Montt
Sara del Campo de Montt (1855–1942), First Lady of Chile
Teresa Wilms Montt (1893–1921): poet
Cristina Montt (1895–1969): early film actress
 (1904–1983): politician and representative for Itata and San Carlos provinces
 (born 1925): lawyer, former diplomat to the ILO and founder rector of the Diego Portales University
 (born 1948): politician and mayor of La Reina (Santiago)
 (1934–2019): ballerina and model
Andrés Wood Montt (born 1965): film director

See also
History of Chile

External links
Familia Montt Prado in genealog.cl 
Genealogical chart of Montt family 

 
Chilean families